Alexander James Douglas "Lex" Bell OAM (born 13 July 1945) is an Australian politician. Born in Brisbane, he received a Master of Laws from Bond University and a Bachelor of Law from the University of Queensland before becoming a solicitor of the Supreme Court of Queensland. He was also on Gold Coast City Council from 1985–2001, including a period as mayor 1988–1994. He was also a chancellor with the Anglican Catholic Church.

On 20 March 2001, former National Party Premier and member for Surfers Paradise Rob Borbidge resigned from the Legislative Assembly of Queensland. Bell contested the resulting by-election as an independent.  Due to voter anger at going back to the polls for the second time in three months, the National vote collapsed to eight percent, and Bell was elected with 58 percent of the two-candidate preferred vote.  He held the seat until the 2004 state election, when he finished third on the primary vote, allowing his Liberal challenger in 2001, John-Paul Langbroek, to win the seat.
Mr Bell announced in late 2011 he would contest his former council seat of Division 7 in Surfers Paradise which he regained on 28 April 2012.

References

Independent members of the Parliament of Queensland
1945 births
Living people
Members of the Queensland Legislative Assembly
Recipients of the Medal of the Order of Australia
Bond University alumni
People from the Gold Coast, Queensland
Mayors of Gold Coast
21st-century Australian politicians